Zemlyak ( was a Russian political movement which emerged in 1992, founded by Mikhail Lukyanov, advocating for Russia to return the Kuril Islands to Japan as it would benefit the islanders economically.

The movement became extremely unpopular due to its leader's firmly pro-Japanese position during the 1990s, heavy investments into the Kuril islands by Moscow in recent years and marginalisation of the movement. As of 2019 the movement has сeased to exist and its former leader is considered an outcast among the locals.

References

External links
http://www.academia.edu/7590777/The_Politics_of_Russo-Japanese_Cultural_Exchange

Kuril Islands
Russian irredentism
Politics of Japan
Politics of Russia
Japan–Russia relations
1992 establishments in Russia